Fuquay Springs High School, also known as Fuquay-Varina Middle School, is a historic high school located at Fuquay-Varina, Wake County, North Carolina.  It was built about 1925, and is a two-story, rectangular, flat-roofed, red brick, Colonial Revival style building. It has a one-story rear auditorium wing.  The school was connected by an open breezeway to a cafeteria building built about 1948. In the early 2000s the campus underwent a renovation and addition by the Wake County Public School System which consisted in converting the existing 1925 building into an administration hall along with a few classrooms. The 1948 construction was demolished along with a few other buildings. The renovation took place to address the issue of students having to go outside to switch classes, so the buildings on the north end of the campus with the exception of the gym was demolished. The new construction ties the rest of the buildings from the north end of the campus to the south end opening in 2003.

The 1925 building was listed on the National Register of Historic Places in 2002.

References

High schools in North Carolina
School buildings on the National Register of Historic Places in North Carolina
Colonial Revival architecture in North Carolina
School buildings completed in 1925
Schools in Wake County, North Carolina
National Register of Historic Places in Wake County, North Carolina
1925 establishments in North Carolina